The 2022 Rugby Europe Women's Sevens Championship Series will be the 2022 edition of Rugby Europe's annual rugby sevens season. Ten participating nations will compete in two legs, in Lisbon, Portugal, and Kraków, Poland. There was a separate 2022 Rugby World Cup Sevens European Qualifier event held in Bucharest in July.

Russia and Ukraine were both scheduled to participate, however, following the Russian invasion of Ukraine, the World Rugby Executive Council barred the Rugby Union of Russia and Ukraine withdrew. Both France and Ireland, who were due to be relegated to the 2022 Trophy tournament as a punishment for not fielding teams in the previous 2021 Championship competition, were awarded the places vacated by Russia and Ukraine.

Schedule

Teams

Standings

First leg – Lisbon

Pool stage

Pool A

Pool B

Ranking Games

Final

3rd-place play-off

5th-place play-off

7th-place play-off

9th-place play-off
 

Results

Second leg – Kraków

Pool stage

Pool A

Pool B

Knockout stage

9th-10th playoff

5th–8th playoffs

1st-4th playoffs

Results

References

 

 
  

2022
2022 rugby sevens competitions
2022 in Portuguese sport
2022 in Polish sport
June 2022 sports events in Portugal
July 2022 sports events in Poland